Selva Negra Cloud Forest Reserve is a nature reserve in Nicaragua. It is one of the 78 reserves which are officially under protection in the country.

External links
 Selva Negra Private Reserve - Explore Nicaragua

Protected areas of Nicaragua
Matagalpa Department
Forest reserves